Esterified estrogens (EEs), sold under the brand names Estratab and Menest among others, is an estrogen medication which is used hormone therapy for menopausal symptoms and low sex hormone levels in women, to treat breast cancer in both women and men, and to treat prostate cancer in men. It is formulated alone or in combination with methyltestosterone. It is taken by mouth.

Side effects of EEs include nausea, breast tension, edema, and breakthrough bleeding among others. It is an estrogen, or an agonist of the estrogen receptors, the biological target of estrogens like estradiol. EEs are a prodrug mainly of estradiol and to a lesser extent of equilin.

EEs were introduced for medical use by 1970. They are available in only a few countries, such as Chile and the United States. They have also been marketed in Argentina and Switzerland in the past.

Medical uses
EEs are used in hormone therapy for menopausal symptoms, female hypogonadism, ovariectomy, and primary ovarian failure and in the treatment of breast cancer and prostate cancer.

Available forms
EEs are available in the form of 0.3 mg, 0.625 mg, 1.25 mg, and 2.5 mg oral tablets. Estratest is a combination formulation of 1.25 mg EEs with 2.5 mg methyltestosterone.

Side effects

Pharmacology

EEs consist primarily of sodium estrone sulfate and sodium equilin sulfate, and are very similar to conjugated estrogens (CEEs, conjugated equine estrogens; brand name Premarin). However, EEs and CEEs differ in the sources of their contents and in the percentages of their constituents; CEEs consist of approximately 53% sodium estrone sulfate and 25% sodium equilin sulfate, while EEs contain about 75 to 85% sodium estrone sulfate and 6 to 11% sodium equilin sulfate. EEs have been found to produce similar serum levels of estrone and estradiol relative to CEEs, although with higher levels of estrone and lower levels of equilin. One study found that the risk of venous thrombosis may be less with EEs relative to CEEs.

Chemistry

EEs contain synthetic, plant-derived estrogens and are manufactured from soybeans and yams.

History
EEs were introduced for medical use by 1970.

Society and culture

Generic names
Estrogens, esterified is the generic name of the drug and its . It is also known as esterified estrogens.

Brand names
EEs are marketed under a variety of brand names including Amnestrogen, Estragyn, Estratab, Evex, Femibel, Femogen, Menest, Neo Estrone Tab, and Oestro-Feminal alone, and, in combination with methyltestosterone, under the brand names Covaryx, Delitan, Eemt, Essian, Estratest, Feminova-T, Menogen, and Syntest.

Availability

EEs are or have been marketed in Argentina, Chile, Switzerland, and the United States. Both EEs and the combination of EEs and methyltestosterone are listed as being marketed only in Chile and the United States as of present.

See also
 Esterified estrogens/methyltestosterone
 Estrogenic substances
 Conjugated estriol
 List of combined sex-hormonal preparations

References

Antigonadotropins
Combination drugs
Estranes
Estrogens
Hormonal antineoplastic drugs
Ketones
Organic sodium salts
Prodrugs
Sulfate esters